This is a list of parties in the world that consider themselves to be upholding the principles and values of democratic socialism or include significant numbers of democratic socialist members (although many do not specifically include the term "Democratic Socialist" in their name). Some of the parties are also members of the Socialist International, Progressive International, São Paulo Forum,  Party of European Left or the Progressive Alliance.

Names used by democratic socialist parties 

 Socialist Party
 Left Party
 Democratic Socialist Party
 Socialist Democratic Party
 Labour Party
 Social Democratic Party
 The workers party UK

Alphabetical list by country

A
Albania:
Organizata Politike
Argentina:
Frente de Todos 
Somos
Intransigent Party
Patria Grande Front
Socialist Party

Armenia:
Armenian Revolutionary Federation
Social Democrat Hunchakian Party
Democratic Party of Armenia
Independent Movement for Justice and Dignity

Australia:
Socialist Alliance 
Victorian Socialists (Victoria)

B
Barbados:
People's Empowerment Party
Belarus:
Belarusian Left Party "A Just World"
Belarusian Green Party
Belgium:
Committee for Another Policy 
Bolivia:
Movement for Socialism
Movement for Sovereignty
Socialist Party-1
Botswana:
Umbrella for Democratic Change:
Botswana People's Party
Brazil:
Workers' Party
Democratic Labour Party
Party of National Mobilization
Socialism and Liberty Party
Bulgaria:
BSP for Bulgaria:
Bulgarian Left
Bulgarian Progressive Line

C
Canada:
New Democratic Party (NDP/NPD)
Québec solidaire (Quebec)
Chile:
Apruebo Dignidad:
Democratic Revolution
Unir Movement
Common Force
Social Convergence
Commons
Colombia:
Historic Pact for Colombia:
Alternative Democratic Pole
Humane Colombia
Patriotic Union
Costa Rica:
Broad Front
Croatia:
Croatian Labourists – Labour Party
New Left
We can!
Workers' Front
Cyprus:
Jasmine Movement
Czech Republic:
The Left

D

Denmark:
Socialist People's Party
Red–Green Alliance

E
East Timor:
Fretilin
Ecuador:
Citizen Revolution Movement
Egypt
National Progressive Unionist Party
Socialist Popular Alliance Party
Socialist Party of Egypt
Estonia
Estonian United Left Party
European Union:
Party of the European Left
DiEM25

F
Faroe Islands (Denmark):
Republic
Finland:
Left Alliance
France:
Génération.s
La France Insoumise
Ensemble!
Citizen and Republican Movement
Eusko Alkartasuna (Basque Country)

G
Germany:
The Left
Greece:
Syriza
MeRA25
Greenland (Denmark):
Inuit Ataqatigiit

H
Haiti:
Platfòm Pitit Desalin
Honduras:
Liberty and Refoundation 
Hungary:
Hungarian Social Democratic Party
Hungarian Socialist Party
Táncsics – Radical Left Party
Yes Solidarity for Hungary Movement

I
Iceland:
Left-Green Movement
Icelandic Socialist Party
India:
Socialist Party
Indonesia:
Labour Party
Just and Prosperous People's Party
Iran:
Organization of Iranian People's Fedaian (Majority)
Democratic Party of Iranian Kurdistan (Eastern Kurdistan)
Kurdistan Democratic Party (Eastern Kurdistan)
Komala (Eastern Kurdistan)
Iraq:
Kurdistan Toilers' Party (Kurdistan region)
Komala (Kurdistan region)
Ireland, Republic of:
Sinn Féin
Italy:
Article One (Art.1)
Italian Left (SI)
Power to the People (PaP)

J
Japan:
Social Democratic Party
New Socialist Party

K

L
Latvia:
Latvian Social Democratic Workers' Party
Luxembourg:
The Left

M
Malaysia:
Malaysian People's Party
Socialist Party of Malaysia
 Mauritius:
Labour Party
Mauritian Militant Movement
Muvman Liberater
Militant Socialist Movement 
Mexico:
National Regeneration Movement
Labor Party
Moldova:
Collective Action Party – Civic Congress
Morocco:
Party of Progress and Socialism
Unified Socialist Party
Front of Democratic Forces
Mozambique:
FRELIMO

N
Namibia:
Landless People's Movement
Nepal:
People's Socialist Party
Socialist Party of Nepal
Netherlands:
Socialist Party
BIJ1
Niger:
Nigerien Party for Democracy and Socialism
Party for Socialism and Democracy in Niger
Nigeria:
Young Progressives Party
Social Democratic Party
Northern Cyprus:
New Cyprus Party
United Cyprus Party
North Macedonia:
The Left
Norway:
Socialist Left Party

O

P
Palestine:
Palestinian National Initiative
Palestinian Democratic Union
Pakistan:
Pakistan Peoples Party (Shaheed Bhutto)
Awami National Party
Awami Workers Party
Paraguay:
Revolutionary Febrerista Party
Progressive Democratic Party
Peru:
New Peru
Citizen Force
Broad Front
Magisterial Bloc
Bicentennial Peru
Philippines:
Akbayan
Laban ng Masa
Philippine Democratic Socialist Party
Poland:
Labour Union
Left Together
Polish Socialist Party
Freedom and Equality
Polish Left
Portugal:
Left Bloc
LIVRE

R

Romania:
Democracy and Solidarity Party
Russia:
Party of Russia's Rebirth
For a New Socialism
Left Socialist Action
Russian Socialist Movement
Rwanda:
Rwandan Socialist Party

S
San Marino:
Libera San Marino
Serbia:
Party of the Radical Left
Singapore:
Workers' Party of Singapore
Democratic Progressive Party
People's Power Party
Slovakia:
Socialisti.sk
Slovenia:
The Left
South Korea:
Labor Party
Spain:
Podemos
Sobiranistes (Catalonia)
Coalició Compromís (Valencia)
Galician Nationalist Bloc (Galicia)
Chunta Aragonesista (Aragon)
Més per Mallorca (Mallorca/Majorca)
Socialist Party of Majorca (Mallorca/Majorca)
Suriname:
National Democratic Party
Surinamese Labour Party
Sweden:
Left Party
Switzerland:
Social Democratic Party of Switzerland
Swiss Party of Labour
Syria:
Democratic Arab Socialist Union
Syrian Democratic People's Party

T
Taiwan:
People's Democratic Party
Tanzania:
Alliance for Change and Transparency
Turkey:
Democratic Left Party
Peoples' Democratic Party
Tunisia:
Movement of Socialist Democrats

U
Uganda:
Uganda People's Congress

United Kingdom:
Labour Party (UK)
Left Unity (LU)
Breakthrough Party (BK) 
Socialist Labour Party (SLP)
Northern Independence Party (Northern England)
Sinn Féin (SF) (Northern Ireland)
Progressive Unionist Party (PUP) (Northern Ireland)
Scottish Socialist Party (SSP) (Scotland)
Plaid Cymru (Wales)

United States:
Democratic Socialists of America
Socialist Party USA
Peace and Freedom Party
Green Party of the United States
Green Mountain Peace and Justice Party (Vermont)
Vermont Progressive Party (Vermont)
Washington Progressive Party (Washington)

Uruguay:
Broad Front, composed of:
Socialist Party of Uruguay
Movement of Popular Participation

V
Venezuela:
For Social Democracy
Movement for Socialism

W

X

Y

Z

See also

 Social democracy
 Democratic socialism
 List of social democratic parties
 List of social democratic and democratic socialist parties that have governed
 Socialist International
 Progressive International
 São Paulo Forum

References

Socialism-related lists
Parties and organizations
Social democracy
Lists of political parties
Democratic socialist parties
Social democratic parties
Democratic socialist